Jonas Kocher is a musician and composer born in Nyon (Switzerland) in 1977. He has been based in Biel/Bienne) since the late 1990s.

Biography 
Composer and accordionist Jonas Kocher followed his musical studies at the University of the Arts in Bern between 1996 and 2004 with Teodoro Anzellotti, Pierre Sublet and Georges Aperghis. He soon developed a keen interest in experimental practices in sound and performance, which led him to explore musical theater as a performer in productions by Ruedy Häusermann and Daniel Ott and electronic music in the BlindeKinder duo. Since 2003 he has been creating his own pieces of composed theatre, various sound performances and he also dedicates himself to composition and free improvisation. Starting from 2006 and for a few years, he has worked closely with Association Rue du Nord (Lausanne).

Since 2008, he has performed as accordionist with regular partners such as Jacques Demierre, Axel Dörner, Joke Lanz, Christian Wolfarth, Gaudenz Badrutt, Michel Doneda, Chris Heenan, Christof Kurzmann, Alfredo Costa Monteiro (in the accordion trio 300 basses with Luca Venitucci), Leonel Kaplan, Hans Koch, Burkhard Beins, Radu Malfatti, Ilan Manouach, Andy Guhl and many others. His musical activity has led him to perform throughout Europe and in Russia, Japan, and the USA and to collaborate with dancers and visual artists.

As interpreter, he has collaborated with musicians and composers such as Christian Kesten, Stefan Thut, Antoine Chessex, Chiyoko Szlavnics, and Radu Malfatti. If his practice of improvisation seems to contrast with his parallel interest in composition and sound performance, it is only because the creative dimension of these areas is not taken into account in its entirety; this is an area where Jonas Kocher sees a field of privileged artistic experimentation and where listening, sound and space are constantly explored.

As a composer, he has produced works that range between composed theatre, installations and concert pieces. He has composed occasionally for audio drama, dance and theater. Jonas Kocher is active as an organizer of concerts in Switzerland and elsewhere and he is running Bruit, a platform dedicated to experimental sound practices.

In 2005 he received the Art award of the city of Nyon and in 2010 the prize of recognition of the music committee of the Canton of Berne. Award Winner of the Liechti Prize for the Arts 2020. His works have been performed at the Biennale Bern 2010, Musikfestival Bern 2017 and 2018, Umlaut festival Berlin, the Jardins Musicaux festival of Cernier, the Forge London, the Zagreb Biennale, SMC Lausanne, Thessaloniki Art Biennale, etc.

Works 
 2021: All Them Takes, for five amplified musicians - Puts Marie
 2019: Perspectives and echoes, for 6 players (percussion, live electronics and four instruments - Ensemble Studio6 Belgrade
 2018: Avec Bataille, performance for 7 participants with headphones and one improvising musician - La Marmite, Geneva
 2018: HOME (Münstergasse 37), in situ sound performance for 4 musicians and 2 actors - Aabat Ensemble Bern
 2017: Irrlicht, for loudspeakers and four performers in a resonant space - Ginger Ensemble
 2017: Rough, for 10 musicians - Ensemble Phoenix Basel
 2015: hálos, for harp solo
 2015: Intervention No. 2 [pasquart], in situ sound performance
 2015: Intervention No. 1 [cave12], in situ sound performance
 2013: Hornussen, in situ sound performance - Festival Rümlingen
 2013: Nichi Nichi Kore Ko Nichi, sound performance
 2012: Commedia, for piano, clarinet, violin, vcello and pre-recorded sounds - Mercury Quartet London
 2011: Agitations (Adagio), for small symphony orchestra (young interpreters) and pre-recorded sounds
 2010: Frictions, musical theater
 2010: Promenade à travers une œuvre, in situ sound performance
 2010: Grrrrr!!, for string quartet (young interpreters)
 2009: Serge, for ensemble - Compagnie CH.AU
 2008: 3 ombres, for ensemble (three compositions intended to be played with Pierrot Lunaire of A. Schönberg) - Szene und Musik Zürich
 2006: Vallon de l'Ermitage, in situ sound performance
 2005: Dubbing & Naturjutz, for ensemble - Compagnie CH.AU
 2005: Harmonie mit schräger Dämpfung und Sopranbimbo, for ensemble and pre-recorded sounds - Ensemble Paul Klee
 2004: Play Along, for tenor saxophone and pre-recorded sounds
 2004: Kopf hoch! for 4 performers and 5 tape recorders
 2004: Les Adieux, in situ sound performance / musical theater
 2003: Bianca K., musical theater

Discography 
 2022 : Stranger Becoming with Hans Koch, Frantz Loriot, CD/Bruit
 2022 : Baldrian Quartett with Gaudenz Badrutt, Kai Fagaschinski, Christof Kurzmann, CD/Bruit
 2021 : Perspectives and Echoes // Tautologos III with -bRt- group for music creation, CD/Bruit
 2021 : Štiri dela with Šalter Ensamble, CD/Sploh-Bruit
 2020 : oto no kage with Radu Malfatti, Klaus Filip & Christian Kobi, CD-r/b-boim records
 2020 : Archytas Curve with Hans Koch & Gaudenz Badrutt, EP/Wide Ear Records
 2020 : Abstract Musette with Joke Lanz, LP/Corvo Records
 2020 : Flatwise Huddle with Gaudenz Badrutt & Andy Guhl e.o. LP/Edizioni Periferia
 2018 : Cone of Confusion with Jacques Demierre and Axel Dörner, CD/Bruit
 2017 : Spoon Bridge, with Michel Doneda & Christian Wolfarth, digital download/Bandcamp
 2017 : Chiyoko Szlavnics ‘During a Lifetime, with Apartment House, Konus Quartet, Hannes Lingens, CD/Another Timbre
 2017 : HumaNoise Tutti , with Erel, Kakaliagou, Marshall, Marwedel, Nabicht, Phillipp, Rodrigues, Schliemann, Souchal,  CD/Creative Sources
 2016 : Jonas Kocher plays Christian Kesten & Stefan Thut, CD/Bruit
 2016 : Floating piece of space with Jacques Demierre and Axel Dörner, LP/label cave12
 2016 : Kocher-Manouach-Papageorgiou, CD/Bruit
 2015 : Tria Atoma, 300 Basses (Alfredo Costa Monteiro, Jonas Kocher et Luca Venitucci), CD/Moving Furniture Records
 2015 : Rotonda with Gaudenz Badrutt and Ilia Belorukov, CD/Intonema
 2015 : Koch-Kocher-Badrutt with Hans Koch and Gaudenz Badrutt, CD/Bruit
 2015 : Skeleton Drafts with Ilan Manouach, CD/BRUIT-Romvos
 2014 : Cinéma Rex with Gaudenz Badrutt, free download/Insubordination
 2013 : Le Belvédère du Rayon Vert with Michel Doneda, CD/Flexion records
 2013 : Öcca with Jacques Demierre, Cyril Bondy and D'Incise, LP/Bocian records
 2012 : Sei Ritornelli, 300 Basses (Alfredo Costa Monteiro, Jonas Kocher and Lucas Venitucci), CD/Potlatch
 2012 : Strategy of behaviour in unexpected situations, with Gaudenz Badrutt, CD free download/Insubordination
 2012 : Duos 2011 with H. Koch, P. Bosshard, G. Badrutt, C. Wolfarth, C. Schiller, U. Leimgruber, C. Müller, CD/Flexion records 2012
 2012 : archive #1, with Insub meta orchestra, CD and free download/Insubordination
 2012 : D'Incise-Henning-Kocher-Sciss, CD-r and free download/Insubordination
 2011 : Udarnik with Michel Doneda, Tomaz Grom and Tao G.V. Sambolec, CD/L'Innomable
 2011 : Action mécanique with Michel Doneda, CD/Flexion records
 2011 : Solo, CD and free download/Insubordination
 2011 : ///grape skin with Michel Doneda and Christophe Schiller, CD/Another Timbre
 2009 : Materials, CD/Creative Sources
 2009 : Live at St-Gervais, Ensemble Rue du Nord, CD-r and free download/Insubordination
 2009 : Müküs with Morgane Gallay, Lionel Gafner, Lucien Dubuis, Vincent Membrez and Fred Bürki, CD/Veto records
 2009 : Blank Disc w/Jonas Kocher with Srdjan Muc and Robert Roza, CD-r
 2006 : BlindeKinder [helfen bauen] with Raphael Raccuia, CD/Everest records

References 
 , Interview by Guillaume Belhomme in Le Son du grisli, 2016/02/06 (in French)
 Revue & Corrigée #97 – by Kasper T.Toeplitz 2013/09, p. 7-10 (in French)
 "Jonas Kocher" in the Vaudean Musicians database
 24 Heures – La Côte, 2005/12/12, p. 20
 De l'art helvétique contemporain, Blog 24 heures, Jean-Paul Gavard-Perret, 2013/23/09

External links 
 Jonas Kocher website
 Bruit

1977 births
Living people
People from Nyon
People from Biel/Bienne
Swiss composers
Swiss male composers
Swiss accordionists
21st-century accordionists
21st-century male musicians